The pennant-winged nightjar (Caprimulgus vexillarius) is a species of nightjar that occurs from Nigeria to northern South Africa. It is an intra-African migrant and displays remarkable sexual dimorphism in the breeding season.

Range and habitat
Their preferred habitat south of the equator is plateau woodlands, especially Miombo, where they are partial to stony or boulder-strewn hillsides. They are observed as bi-annual and social passage migrants along the Kenyan Rift Valley and Lake Victoria regions, and spend the non-breeding season in subtropical savanna from Nigeria to Sudan.

Description
The male of the species is characteristic in having a broad white band over the otherwise black primaries. In addition the males acquire a striking 2nd primary feather during the breeding season. These pennant feathers grow to greater lengths in successive years, up to twice the body length. They are dropped or broken off quickly upon completion of breeding. With the distal (9th) and proximal (1st - 3rd) primaries being longest, the wings of male birds are distinctly angular.

Habits
Foraging birds emerge in the late afternoon or directly after sunset for crepuscular feeding and are once again active before sunrise. Their diet includes a variety of insects although scarab beetles are favoured. They drink while flying slowly over a water surface. The roost and nest are on bare ground, sometimes among leaf litter. When disturbed they may perch lengthwise on a branch, reminiscent of the similar-sized European nightjar.

Breeding
Breeding takes place from spring to early summer while south of the equator. Males have separate display territories and attract passing females with an insect-like song. Males furthermore engage in display flights, low through woodland or at great height, wherein they may be joined by receptive females. Egg-laying coincides with the full moon. By mid-summer some birds start returning to the northern hemisphere.

Gallery

References

 McLachlan G.R. & Liversidge R., Roberts' Birds of Southern Africa. Revised edition. 1965.
 Maclean G.L., Roberts' Birds of Southern Africa. Fifth edition. 1984. 
 Hockey P.A.R. et al., Roberts Birds of Southern Africa VII. 2005. 
 Zimmerman D.A. et al., Birds of Kenya. 1996. 
 Maclean G.L., Pennant-winged Nightjar. In: The atlas of southern African birds. Vol. 1: Non-passerines. 1997. 
 Sinclair I., Ryan P., Birds of Africa south of the Sahara. 2003.

External links

 Nightjar - Species text in The Atlas of Southern African Birds.

pennant-winged nightjar
Birds of Sub-Saharan Africa
pennant-winged nightjar